is a passenger railway station in located in the city of Toba,  Mie Prefecture, Japan, operated by the private railway operator Kintetsu Railway.

Lines
Shima-Akasaki Station is served by the Shima Line, and is located 43.8 rail kilometers from the terminus of the line at Ise-Nakagawa Station.

Station layout
The station was consists of two opposed side platforms connected by a footbridge. The station is unattended.

Platforms

Adjacent stations

History
Shima-Akasaki Station opened on July 25, 1949 as a station on Mie Kotsu. When Mie Kotsu dissolved on February 1, 1964, the station became part of the Mie Electric Railway, which was then acquired by Kintetsu on April 1, 1965. The station building was reconstructed in 1969 and has used PiTaPa automated wicket gates since 2007. The station has been unattended since 2011.

Passenger statistics
In fiscal 2019, the station was used by an average of 232 passengers daily (boarding passengers only).

Surrounding area
Toba High School
Toba Police Station
Toba Fire Station
Jusco department store

See also
List of railway stations in Japan

References

External links

 Kintetsu: Shima-Akasaki Station 

Railway stations in Japan opened in 1949
Railway stations in Mie Prefecture
Stations of Kintetsu Railway
Toba, Mie